The Kitchen is a 1957 play by Arnold Wesker. It was Wesker's first work which is his most performed play. It has been produced in sixty cities including Rio de Janeiro, Tokyo, Paris - where it was the first widely recognized production by Théâtre du Soleil in 1967, Moscow, Montreal and Zurich. The play follows the staff in a cafe's kitchen during the course of a busy morning. A film version appeared in 1961.

The play was subject to a major revival at the National Theatre's Olivier Theatre in 2011.

References 

1957 plays
Plays by Arnold Wesker